The Minister for the Navy was the Danish minister responsible for the administration of the Royal Danish Navy.

History
The position of Minister for the Navy was created following the end of the Absolute monarchy, when the Admiralty was disbanded, and power transferred to elected officials. While the Minister of War and the Minister for the Navy's positions were merged in 1905, the Ministries continued to exists separately until 1950.

List of ministers

References

Lists of government ministers of Denmark
Government ministerial offices of Denmark